This is a table of principal paved highway passes on or near the crest of the Sierra Nevada, United States. The road passes are generally listed from north to south, with their elevation and access road.

The California Department of Transportation attempts to keep Donner Summit (Interstate 80, I-80), Echo Summit (U.S. Route 50, US 50) and Carson Pass (State Route 88, SR 88) open year-round. Most other passes at higher elevation than these are usually closed during winter, with opening and closure dates varying based on snowfall and available road clearing and repair resources.

See also
 
 
 List of mountain passes in California

References

External links
Caltrans - Mountain Pass Closures

Road passes
Sierra Nevada road passes
Sierra Nevada
Sierra Nevada